Oonops is a spider genus mostly found in America, Europe to Russia and East and North Africa.

One species – O. pulcher – is not only found in Europe and North Africa, but also on Tasmania, although no species occurs on the Australian mainland. O. triangulipes is distributed in Micronesia. O. caecus is restricted to Lesotho, and O. leai is endemic to Lord Howe Island.

Species 

 Oonops acanthopus Simon, 1907 — Brazil
 Oonops alticola Berland, 1914 — East Africa
 Oonops amacus Chickering, 1970 — Trinidad
 Oonops amoenus Dalmas, 1916 — France
 Oonops aristelus Chickering, 1972 — Antigua
 Oonops balanus Chickering, 1971 — West Indies
 Oonops caecus Benoit, 1975 — Lesotho
 Oonops citrinus Berland, 1914 — East Africa
 Oonops cubanus Dumitrescu & Georgescu, 1983 — Cuba
 Oonops cuervus Gertsch & Davis, 1942 — Mexico
 Oonops domesticus Dalmas, 1916 — Western Europe to Russia
 Oonops ebenecus Chickering, 1972 — Puerto Rico
 Oonops erinaceus Benoit, 1977 — St. Helena
 Oonops figuratus Simon, 1891 — St. Vincent, Venezuela
 Oonops gavarrensis Bosselaers, 2017 - Spain
 Oonops globimanus Simon, 1891 — St. Vincent, Venezuela
 Oonops hasselti Strand, 1906 — Scandinavia
 Oonops itascus Chickering, 1970 — Trinidad
 Oonops leai Rainbow, 1920 — Lord Howe Islands
 Oonops leitaoni Bristowe, 1938 — Brazil
 Oonops longespinosus Denis, 1937 — Algeria
 Oonops longipes Berland, 1914 — East Africa
 Oonops loxoscelinus Simon, 1893 — Venezuela
 Oonops lubricus Dalmas, 1916 — France
 Oonops mahnerti Brignoli, 1974 — Greece
 Oonops minutus Dumitrescu & Georgescu, 1983 — Cuba
 Oonops oblucus Chickering, 1972 — Jamaica
 Oonops olitor Simon, 1910 — Algeria
 Oonops ornatus Chickering, 1970 — Panama
 Oonops persitus Chickering, 1970 — Panama
 Oonops petulans Gertsch & Davis, 1942 — Mexico
 Oonops placidus Dalmas, 1916 — France
 Oonops placidus corsicus Dalmas, 1916 — France, Italy
 Oonops procerus Simon, 1882 — France, Spain
 Oonops propinquus Dumitrescu & Georgescu, 1983 — Cuba
 Oonops pulcher Templeton, 1835 — Europe to Ukraine, North Africa, Tasmania
 Oonops pulcher hispanicus Dalmas, 1916 — Spain
 Oonops pulicarius Simon, 1891 — St. Vincent, Venezuela
 Oonops reddelli Gertsch, 1977 — Mexico
 Oonops reticulatus Petrunkevitch, 1925 — Costa Rica, Panama, Puerto Rico, Trinidad
 Oonops ronoxus Chickering, 1971 — Virgin Islands
 Oonops rowlandi Gertsch, 1977 — Mexico
 Oonops sativus Chickering, 1970 — Trinidad
 Oonops sicorius Chickering, 1970 — Curaçao
 Oonops stylifer Gertsch, 1936 — USA
 Oonops tectulus Chickering, 1970 — Trinidad
 Oonops triangulipes Karsch, 1881 — Micronesia
 Oonops tubulatus Dalmas, 1916 — Portugal, Algeria
 Oonops vestus Chickering, 1970 — Trinidad
 Oonops viridans Bryant, 1942 — Puerto Rico

References 

Oonopidae
Araneomorphae genera
Spiders of North America
Spiders of South America
Spiders of Africa
Taxa named by Robert Templeton